Leptolalax ardens is a species of frog in the family Megophryidae.

References

ardens
Amphibians described in 2016